Julius Buckler PlM (1894-1960) was a German fighter ace during World War I. He was credited with 36 confirmed aerial victories flying with Jagdstaffel 17. As one of the few pilots daring enough to undertake the highly hazardous assaults on opposing observation balloons, he counted seven of them among his three dozen victories.

List of victories

As the primary arena for aerial combat on the Western Front was over the German trenches and rear works, German aerial and ground observers could usually verify German victories in considerable detail. Aviation historians cited have further researched the war's victory claims, using archives from all sides.

Confirmed victories in this list are numbered and listed chronologically.

This list is complete for entries, though obviously not for all details. Abbreviations from sources utilized were expanded by editor creating this list. Sources: Norman Franks, Frank Bailey, Russell Guest (1993). Above the Lines: The Aces and Fighter Units of the German Air Service, Naval Air Service and Flanders Marine Corps, 1914–1918. Grub Street Publishing, London.

References

Aerial victories of Buckler, Julius
Buckler, Julius